Kazakhstan participated in the Junior Eurovision Song Contest 2020. The Kazakh entrant for the 2020 contest in Warsaw, Poland was selected through a national selection, organised by the Kazakh broadcaster Khabar Agency (KA). The semi-final took place online between 24 and 31 August 2020, while the final took place on 26 September 2020. "Forever" performed by Karakat Bashanova was as the winner.

Background

Prior to the 2020 contest, Kazakhstan's highest placing in the contest was in 2019, when the song "Armanyńnan qalma" performed by Yerzhan Maxim placed 2nd with 227 points.

As Khabar Agency (KA) is not an active member of the European Broadcasting Union (EBU), the broadcaster requires a special invitation from the EBU to participate in Eurovision events. Channel 31 had previously expressed their ambitions to debut in the 2018 contest, and had sent a delegation to the  contest.

Before Junior Eurovision

National final
Kazakhstan's participation in the 2020 contest was confirmed in June 2020, having been invited to participate by the European Broadcasting Union (EBU). Khabar announced on 10 August 2020 that artists will be able to submit their applications for the national final until 20 August 2020. From 684 applications submitted, a nine-member jury panel selected 30 acts for the online semi-final. The jury panel consisted of Zhenis Seidullaevich (composer), Dinara Bisembina (Chairman of the Board of Khabar), Bagym Mukhitdenova (music producer), Kairat Baekenov (singer and composer), Erlan Bekchurin (music producer), Zhanar Dugalova (singer), Amre (singer), Dinaya (singer) and Madi Syzdykov (singer).

Semi-final
The online semi-final took place between 24 and 31 August 2020 where users were able vote for their favorite artists on Khabar's official website. The top twelve acts with the most votes proceeded to the televised national final and were announced on 1 September 2020.

Final
The final took place on 26 September 2020 where twelve competing acts performed their candidate Junior Eurovision songs written for them by composers directly invited by Khabar in a televised production. The winner, "Forever" performed by Karakat Bashanova, was determined by a 50/50 combination of both public telephone vote and the votes of jury members made up of music professionals.

Artist and song information

Karakat Bashanova 

Karakat Bashanova (born 11 March 2008) is a Kazakh child singer. She represented Kazakhstan at the Junior Eurovision Song Contest 2020 in Warsaw, Poland, on 29 November 2020 with the song "Forever".

Bashanova was born in the village of Ryskulov, Almaty Region in Kazakhstan on March 11, 2008. Karakat is now enrolled at a music boarding school named after famous Kazakh opera singer Kulyash Baiseitova, where she plays the piano and violin. Karakat has participated in several singing contests in the region. She was a finalist in 'The Voice of Children 2018' and also placed third at the II open children's vocal festival 'Happy Child 2019'.

Forever 
"Forever" is a song by Kazakh singer Karakat Bashanova. The song is dedicated to her deceased father.

It represented Kazakhstan at the Junior Eurovision Song Contest 2020 in Warsaw, Poland. The song came in 2nd place with 152 points.

At Junior Eurovision
After the opening ceremony, which took place on 23 November 2020, it was announced that Kazakhstan will perform second on 29 November 2020, following Germany and preceding the Netherlands.

Voting

Detailed voting results

References

Junior Eurovision Song Contest
Countries in the Junior Eurovision Song Contest 2020
2020